The individual jumping in equestrian at the 2012 Olympic Games in London was held at Greenwich Park from 4 to 8 August. Like all other equestrian events, the jumping competition was mixed gender, with both male and female athletes competing in the same division. There were 75 competitors from 26 nations. The event was won by Steve Guerdat of Switzerland, the nation's first victory in individual jumping since 1924 and second overall (tying the United States for fourth-most). Gerco Schroder of the Netherlands took silver. Cian O'Connor of Ireland, who had been stripped of a gold medal in the event in 2004, earned bronze—Ireland's first medal in the event.

Background

This was the 24th appearance of the event, which had first been held at the 1900 Summer Olympics and has been held at every Summer Olympics at which equestrian sports have been featured (that is, excluding 1896, 1904, and 1908). It is the oldest event on the current programme, the only one that was held in 1900.

Nine of the top 14 riders (including ties for 9th place) from the 2008 Games returned: gold medalist Eric Lamaze of Canada, silver medalist (and 2004 fourth-place finisher) Rolf-Göran Bengtsson of Sweden, bronze medalist Beezie Madden of the United States, fourth-place finisher Meredith Michaels-Beerbaum of Germany, fifth-place finisher McLain Ward of the United States, seventh-place finisher Marc Houtzager of the Netherlands, and ninth-place finishers Steve Guerdat of Switzerland, Edwina Alexander of Australia, and Jos Lansink of Belgium. Also returning were Cian O'Connor of Ireland, who had taken gold in 2004 until being stripped of it due to a doping violation, and Rodrigo Pessoa of Brazil, the beneficiary of that disqualification in taking gold in 2004 who had himself had a fifth-place finish in 2008 wiped out by a doping violation. The reigning World Champion was Philippe Le Jeune of Belgium; Lansink (2006) and Pessoa (1998) were also former World Champions. The #1-ranked rider, and European champion, was Bengtsson; he was a favorite along with Pius Schwizer and Steve Guerdat of Switzerland and Nick Skelton of Great Britain.

Syria made its debut in the event. France and the United States both competed for the 21st time, tied for most of any nation.

Qualification

Each National Olympic Committee (NOC) could qualify up to 4 horse and rider pairs; there were a total of 75 quota places. Each of the 15 nations qualified for the team jumping could enter 4 pairs in the individual event. The qualified teams were:

 Host Great Britain
 5 teams from the World Equestrian Games: Germany, France, Belgium, Brazil, and Canada
 3 teams from the European Jumping Championship: the Netherlands, Sweden, and Switzerland
 3 teams from the Pan American Games: the United States, Mexico, and Chile
 1 team from the World Games from regional groups C or G: Australia
 1 team from the qualification event for groups C or G: Ukraine
 1 team from the World Games and the qualification event from group F: Saudi Arabia

There were also 15 individual qualification places, with NOCs not earning team spots able to earn up to 2 individual spots. All of these places were assigned by regional groups:
 Groups A and B had three spots, assigned through rankings
 Group C had two spots, assigned through rankings
 Group D had one spot and Group E had 4 spots, assigned through the Pan American Games
 Group F had three spots, two assigned through the World Games and one through a qualification event
 Group G had two spots, one assigned through the World Games and one through a qualification event

Competition format

Five rounds of jumping were conducted, in two stages. The first three rounds made up the qualifications, with cuts between each round. The top 60 advanced to the second round; the top 45 advanced to the third round. The second and third rounds were also used for the team jumping event. Following the qualifications, the top 35 pairs moved on to the final round. Only the top 20 pairs advanced to the second of the two final rounds. Final rankings were based on the sum of scores from both rounds of the final stage. A jump-off would be held to break a tie for any of the medal positions.

Schedule 

All times are British Summer Time (UTC+1)

Results

Qualifying round

Round 1 

The first qualifying round was run on a relatively easy course with a length of 510 m and an allowed time of 1:22.

Round 2 

The course for the second round was 550 m long with an allowed time of 1:28.

Round 3 

The course for the third round was 550 meters long (with 13 fences) with an allowed time of 1:28.

Bengtsson withdrew from the final when his horse, Casall, turned up lame the morning of the final. Two riders (Muff and Vrieling) were ineligible as the fourth-best riders from their nations. The qualifying rank thus went from 35 to 38. A three-way tie for 38th resulted in all three advancing, for a total of 37 finalists.

Final round

Round A 

O'Connor, who had only reached the final due to Bengtsson's withdrawal, took advantage of the fresh scoring, as one of six riders to clear round A cleanly.

Round B

Silver medal jump-off

References 

Individual jumping